Nature (Hangul: 네이처; stylized in all caps) is a South Korean girl group formed by  in 2018. The group debuted on August 3, 2018, with the single album Girls and Flowers, accompanied by the lead single "Allegro Cantabile". The group has divided into three sub-units - Charming, Twinkle, and Cutie.

History
In June 2018, a South Korean talent management and television production company founded and headed by former SM Entertainment executive Jung Chang-hwan, announced that it will launch its own all-girl group, NATURE, in August.

2018: Debut, line up changes and further releases
Nature made their debut on August 3 with the single album Girls and Flowers and its lead single, "Allegro Cantabile".
 The music video features the 9 members, including former member Yeolmae, who departed from the group quietly before debut. The songs were re-recorded to only feature the current 8 members, and the music video was re-structured to only include close-ups of the current members, and Yeolmae is only present in the choreographic segments. The lead single "Allegro Cantabile" is a remake of the opening to Nodame Cantabile, a popular anime, which was previously recorded by Suemitsu & the Suemith. The group has performed the song through busking performances, as well as on various music shows, including MBC TV, Music Bank, Inkigayo, Arirang TV, and Mnet, where they had performed the song frequently since August 4. On August 24, the group released a Dance Practice of "Allegro Cantabile". Nature won their first award, "New Artist of the Year", on August 30 at Soribada Best K-Music Awards. On September 3, a month after its release, the group  announced through Facebook that the "Allegro Cantabile" Music Video had reached over 2 million views on YouTube.

In the end of August, Nature began a
called "Pop Cover Project", where the girls vocally cover a popular pop song and perform a dance sequence. The project consists of 5 covers. The first video was released on August 28 with cover "Walk Like An Egyptian" (with Yeolmae) by The Bangles, the second video was released on September 8 with cover "My Sharona" by The Knack, the third video was released on September 13 with cover "Shut Up and Let Me Go" by The Ting Tings, the fourth video was released on September 17 with cover "Rhythm Nation" by Janet Jackson and the last video was released on September 20 with cover "Kiss" by Prince.

On November 4, new member Loha was introduced as part of the group through V Live. The next day, the group began teasing their upcoming second single album  Some & Love, which was scheduled to be released on November 22. On November 22, their second single album with the lead single, "Some (You'll Be Mine)" was released. Following their Performance Version of the music video was released on December 3.

2019: I'm So Pretty, line up changes, Aurora's hiatus and Nature World: Code A
On January 15, Nature released a music video for the B track, "Dream About You", from their previous second single, Some & Love. The video features the group donning blue tutus in a dream-like environment and it signifies the first time the group has incorporated an object into the complete choreography, which is a 'magic' star-wand. A Performance Version of the music video was released on January 25.

On June 24, it was confirmed that Nature would make their comeback on July 10 with their first mini album I'm So Pretty. Member Gaga was not involved due to her currently being on hiatus to focus on her studies. The music video for I'm So Pretty was released on July 10. A Performance Version of the music video was released on July 24.

On October 8, former Produce 101 contestant and soloist Kim So-hee was introduced as a new member following her signing with n.Ch Entertainment and it was also confirmed that Gaga has departed from the group to focus on her studies. n.CH Entertainment also confirmed that the group is preparing for a comeback in November. It was later confirmed that the group would make their comeback on November 12 with their second mini album Nature World: Code A. Member Aurora was not involved due to her participation in the third season of the Chinese audition show Idol Producer. The music video for Oopsie (My Bad) was released on November 12.

2020: Japanese debut and comeback as seven with Nature World: Code M 
Nature signed with Pony Canyon and debuted in Japan on February 12, 2020, with a Japanese version of their single "I'm So Pretty". On June 1, the group was confirmed to make their comeback on June 17 with their third single album Nature World: Code M. Loha will not participate due to health reasons, while Aurora will also not participate. It was announced on June 15 that member Sunshine had suffered a leg injury and, while she participated in the album, would not be able to perform on stage for album promotions.

2022: Return with Rica Rica, Nature World: Code W 
On January 13, 2022, through their mockumentary series, NATURE Can't Go Down Like This, they announced that they will return with the special album "Rica Rica" on January 24. Sunshine was not present for the comeback as she is currently under hiatus.

On October 17, an image teaser for the group's third mini album, titled NATURE World: Code W, was uploaded on their social media. It was originally scheduled to be released on November 2, but was postponed to November 6 due to the aftermath of Seoul Halloween crowd crush. Lu will not participate in this comeback due to health issues and member Sunshine will also not return from hiatus.

Members
 Sohee (소희)
 Saebom (새봄)
 Aurora (오로라)
 Lu (루)
 Chaebin (채빈)
 Haru (하루)
 Loha (로하)
 Uchae (유채)
 Sunshine (선샤인)

Former members
 Gaga (가가)

Timeline

Blue represents a release

Discography

Extended plays

Single albums

Singles

OSTs

Videography

Music videos

Filmography

Reality shows

Awards and nominations

Asia Artist Awards

|-
|2021
|Nature
|Female Idol Group Popularity Award
|
|}

Genie Music Awards

|-
|rowspan="4"|2019
|rowspan="4"|Nature
|The Top Artist
|
|-
|The Female New Artist
|
|-
|Genie Music Popularity Award
|
|-
|Global Popularity Award
|
|}

Mnet Asian Music Awards

|-
|rowspan="2"|2018
|rowspan="2"|Nature
|Best New Female Artist
|
|-
|Artist of the Year
|
|}

Soribada Best K-Music Awards

|-
|2018
|rowspan="5"|Nature
|New Artist of the Year
|
|-
|rowspan="3"|2019
|Bonsang Award
|
|-
|Music Star Award
|
|-
|Popularity Award (Female)
|
|-
|rowspan="1"|2020
|New K-wave Rising Star Award
|
|}

Notes

References

External links 

K-pop music groups
South Korean girl groups
South Korean dance music groups
Musical groups from Seoul
Musical groups established in 2018
2018 establishments in South Korea
South Korean pop music groups